George Dundas  (12 November 1819 – 18 March 1880) was a Scottish Tory politician and colonial administrator.

Born in England, he was the eldest son of James Dundas, and resided in Dundas Castle. Dundas purchased a second lieutenantcy in the Rifle Brigade in 1839, serving in various places such as Bermuda and Nova Scotia. He was promoted first lieutenant without purchase in 1842.

In politics, he represented Linlithgowshire in the House of Commons from 1847 until his resignation in 1859.

On 8 June 1859, Dundas was appointed Governor of Prince Edward Island, a position he kept until 22 October 1868. In 1875, Dundas was appointed Lieutenant Governor of Saint Vincent in the Caribbean.  In 1879, he was created a Companion of the Order of St Michael and St George.

Governor Dundas died at Saint Vincent in 1880.

References

Sources 
Oliver & Boyd's new Edinburgh almanac and national repository for the year 1850. Oliver & Boyd, Edinburgh, 1850

External links 

1819 births
1880 deaths
Rifle Brigade officers
Scottish Tory MPs (pre-1912)
Members of the Parliament of the United Kingdom for Scottish constituencies
Lieutenant Governors of the Colony of Prince Edward Island
Companions of the Order of St Michael and St George
UK MPs 1847–1852
UK MPs 1852–1857
UK MPs 1857–1859
Scottish civil servants
Scottish colonial officials
Politics of West Lothian
Governors of British Saint Vincent and the Grenadines